Itna Union is an Union Parishad under Lohagara Upazila of Narail District in the division of Khulna, Bangladesh. It has an area of 75.11 km2 (29.00 sq mi) and a population of 35,138.

References

Unions of Lohagara Upazila, Narail
Unions of Narail District
Unions of Khulna Division